Nicolas Schindelholz (12 February 1988 – 18 September 2022) was a Swiss professional footballer who played as a defender.

Career
Schindelholz began his career with FC Basel, before moving to FC Thun in 2009 as they won promotion to the Swiss Super League. In 2017, he left FC Thun and signed for FC Luzern. Injuries led him to not making his debut with the club for 10 months. In 2018, he was signed to FC Aarau by former Basel youth team coach Patrick Framework. In the summer of 2020, Schindelholz was suspected to be suffering from pneumonia, however it was ultimately diagnosed as cancer.

Death
Schindelholz died from lung cancer on 18 September 2022, at the age of 34. Tributes were paid from around the football community, including by former clubs FC Aarau and FC Thun.

Titles and honours
FC Basel
 Swiss at U18 level: 2005–06
 Swiss Cup at U19/U18 level: 2005–06

References

External links
 
 Player profile at football.ch

1988 births
2022 deaths
Swiss men's footballers
Footballers from Basel
Association football defenders
Swiss Super League players
Swiss Challenge League players
FC Basel players
SC Dornach players
FC Thun players
FC Luzern players
FC Aarau players
Deaths from lung cancer in Switzerland